The Evangelical Movement of Wales, formed in 1948, came to light as a counter move by reformed Christians to the liberal theology which was gaining influence into the Protestant denominations of Wales during the 20th century. The Movement is a fellowship of churches and individuals who accept and recognise the Holy Scriptures, as originally given, as the infallible Word of God and of divine inspiration, and their sole authority in all matters of faith and practice. The Movement serves both English and Welsh speakers. Given this bilingual focus, where appropriate, parallel and corresponding status is given to both languages in their work.

Aims
The Movement's stated aims are:
the promotion of a true and faithful witness to the fundamental truths of the Christian faith and to the essential spiritual unity of those who subscribe to it,
to bring others to a personal knowledge of the Lord Jesus Christ and to encourage such to live a godly life,
to foster evangelism, experiential religion and a concern for revival,
to provide means for uniting and co-ordinating the witness and fellowship of evangelical churches, fellowships and individual Christians,
the formation and supervision of evangelical fellowships,
the publication distribution and sale of English & Welsh literature consistent with the doctrinal belief of the Movement and to facilitate the same to open such shops and other outlets as may be necessary for these purposes,
to provide Christian workers who subscribe to the movement's doctrinal belief with advice and support,
to provide theological education and training for persons aspiring to Christian service within the evangelical constituency,
to co-operate with other bodies, at home and abroad, which subscribe to the movement's doctrinal beliefs in the furtherance of the foregoing aims and objects, and
to help Christians think and act biblically regarding the world in which they live.

History
The Movement's first initiative was to publish Y Cylchgrawn Efengylaidd (The Evangelical Magazine), of which the first edition was November / December 1948.  The magazine was originally published in Welsh and soon after a sister magazine was published in English. Editions of the magazine continue to be published every two months in English, and every three months in Welsh, as of 2012.

The General Secretary of the Movement for 45 years and one of its founders was Rev J. Elwyn Davies, who stated "The Movement became a focus for fellowship, nurture and service for Christians who found themselves placed at a considerable disadvantage in churches and denominations which, to a very considerable extent, had departed from the main tenets of the Christian faith."

The Movement and Dr Martyn Lloyd-Jones (one of its influential supporters), have been influential among Evangelical Christians in Wales and beyond. Experiencing increased hostility in the 1960s and 1970s within their churches, a number of pastors and congregations sympathetic to the Movement left their denominations and set up independent evangelical churches in many parts of Wales.

See also
Christian Hymns (hymnbook)

Sources
 Davies, Gwyn : 'A Light in the Land - Christianity in Wales 200–2000' : 2002 : 
 Gibbard, Noel : 'The history of the Evangelical Movement of Wales 1948–98' : 2002 :

References

External links
Welsh homepage
English homepage

Evangelicalism in the United Kingdom
Christianity in Wales
Evangelical parachurch organizations
Christian organizations established in 1948